Lobonyx is a genus of soft-winged flower beetles in the family Prionoceridae. There are at least 11 described species in Lobonyx.

References

External links

 

Cleroidea
Cleroidea genera